The 2013 Singapore Cup was the 16th season of Singapore's annual premier club football tournament organised by Football Association of Singapore. Due to sponsorship reasons, the Singapore Cup is also known as the RHB Singapore Cup. Warriors FC, then known as Singapore Armed Forces FC, were the defending champions.

The final was played at Jalan Besar Stadium in Kallang, Singapore. Home United, who had finished as quarter-finalists last year, won by defeating S.League rival Tanjong Pagar United 4–1. This was Home's sixth Singapore Cup title, previously winning it in 2000, 2001, 2003, 2005, and 2011. Together with 2013 S.League champions Tampines Rovers, Home United fills the 2014 AFC Cup spot.

The defending champions Warriors were eliminated in the preliminary round, thus becoming the first team to leave the competition as title holders at this stage.

Prize money

For the 2013 edition, Football Association of Singapore (FAS) increased the prize money for the champions, runners-up and second runners-up. A base fee of S$2,000.00 was awarded to losers in the preliminary round. For teams which failed to reach the semi-finals, FAS awarded S$4,000. Thereafter, the third and second runners-up receive a total of S$10,000.00 and S$40,000.00 (up from S$20,000.00) respectively, while the champions and runners-up receive S$100,000.00 (up from S$80,000.00) and S$60,000 (up from S$40,000.00) respectively.

 Preliminary round: S$2,000.00
 Quarter-finals: S$4,000.00
 Third runners-up: S$10,000.00
 Second runners-up: S$40,000.00
 First runners-up: S$60,000.00
 Champions: S$100,000.00

Teams

A total of 16 teams participated in the 2013 Singapore Cup. Twelve of the teams were from domestic S.League and the other four were invited from the Philippines, Cambodia and Laos. Global FC, Boeung Ket Rubber Field and Lao Police Club are the champions of their respective countries' leagues in 2012.

S.League Clubs
  Albirex Niigata (S)
 Balestier Khalsa
  DPMM FC
 Geylang International
  Harimau Muda B
 Home United
 Hougang United
 Tampines Rovers
 Tanjong Pagar United
 Warriors FC
 Woodlands Wellington
  Young Lions

Invited Foreign Teams
  Boeung Ket Rubber Field
  Global FC
  Lao Police Club
  Loyola Meralco Sparks

Format

The sixteen teams were drawn into two distinct pools in the preliminary round. They will play against one another in a single leg knockout basis. Winners of this round will progress and advance to the quarter-finals. Thereafter, matches are played in two legs with the exception of the one-match finals.

Round and draw dates

Unlike previous editions where teams were drawn with a clear route to the final, clubs will now be drawn on a round-by-round basis. The clubs competing in each round of the competition will be drawn in pairs, with the tie to be played in a knockout format.

All draws are held at Football Association of Singapore headquarters in Kallang, Singapore unless stated otherwise.

Preliminary round
In the preliminary round, teams were drawn into two distinct pools. They will play against one another in a single leg knockout basis. The draw for the preliminary round was held on 1 May 2013. The matches will played from 26 May to 1 June 2013. Winners of this round will progress and advance to the quarter-finals.

Knockout phase
In the knockout phase, teams play against each other over two legs on a home-and-away basis, except for the one-match final. The draw for the quarter-finals was held on 4 June 2013. The draws for the semi-finals, third place playoff and final were held on 17 September 2013.

Bracket

Quarter-finals
The first legs were played on 22, 23, 24 and 25 July, and the second legs were played on 26, 27, 28 and 29 July 2013.
Winners of this round advance to the semi-finals.

|}

Semi-finals
The first legs were played on 22, 23, 24 and 25 July, and the second legs were played on 26, 27, 28 and 29 July 2013.
Winners of this round advance to the final, while the losers will vie for the third place in the third place playoff.

|}

Third place playoff

Final

Goalscorers

.

References

External links
 Official S.League website
 Football Association of Singapore website

 
2013
2013 domestic association football cups
Cup